"I Don't Stand a Ghost of a Chance With You" is a 1932 song recorded by Bing Crosby with Orchestral Accompaniment. The music was composed by Victor Young, with lyrics written by Ned Washington and Bing Crosby. The song is a jazz and pop standard recorded by many different artists.

The song was recorded on October 14, 1932 by Bing Crosby in New York with Orchestral Accompaniment.  Bing Crosby was accompanied by the ARC Brunswick Studio Orchestra led by Lennie Hayton, who also played the piano. Two master versions were recorded: B12474-A at 3:12 and B12474-B at 3:18. The recording was released as a 78 single as Brunswick 6454, b/w "Just an Echo in the Valley", and Columbia DB-2030, b/w "Cabin in the Cotton", and as a 45, Columbia 39524, b/w "Temptation". The Brunswick recording charted on January 21, 1933, reaching no. 5 on the US chart.

Crosby performed the song in the 1933 film short Please directed by Arvid E. Gillstrom and he re-recorded the song in 1954 for his album Bing: A Musical Autobiography.

Notable recordings

 Oscar Peterson - Pastel Moods 1956
 Jazz At The Philharmonic All Stars, Norman Granz' Jazz Concert #1, September 16, 1950.

Gene Austin
Mildred Bailey 
Chet Baker
Will Bradley, V-Disc 539A
Clifford Brown - Brown and Roach Incorporated (1954)
Dave Brubeck
Cab Calloway
Maurice Chevalier - performed in the film Folies Bergère de Paris (1935).
June Christy - Complete Capitol Transcription Sessions (2001)
Cozy Cole
Bing Crosby
The Dorsey Brothers
Tommy Dorsey
Duke Ellington
Ted Fio Rito and his Orchestra
Ella Fitzgerald - Digital III at Montreux (1979), Easy Living (1986)
Helen Forrest with Nat King Cole, Lionel Hampton, and Oscar Moore, 1940
Slim Gaillard
Erroll Garner - The Complete Savoy Sessions Vol 2 (1986)
Dizzy Gillespie
Stan Getz
Dexter Gordon
Bobby Hackett
Wynonie Harris, 1947
Billie Holiday
The Hot Sardines
Illinois Jacquet
Etta James
Joni James
Bill Kenny
Andy Kirk and His Twelve Clouds of Joy
Diana Krall - Love Scenes (1997)
Frankie Lymon and the Teenagers
Wynton Marsalis
Tony Martin
Carmen McRae - Torchy!/Blue Moon (1999)
Thelonious Monk - Thelonious Himself (1957)
Vaughn Monroe
Wes Montgomery - Movin' Along (1960)
The New Orleans Jazz Vipers
Houston Person
Wendell Pierce
Linda Ronstadt with Nelson Riddle, on the album What's New (1983).
Artie Shaw and his Orchestra
George Shearing
Frank Sinatra - The Voice of Frank Sinatra (1946), No One Cares (1959)
The Solitaires
Mel Tormé
Lennie Tristano - RCA Victor - 80th Anniversary: 1940-1949
Frankie Trumbauer
Sarah Vaughan
Bea Wain (1939)
Lee Wiley - Night in Manhattan ( 1950), Music of Manhattan, 1951 (1998)
Jackie Wilson with Billy Ward and his Dominoes
Teddy Wilson
Lester Young

See also
List of 1930s jazz standards

References

Sources
Grudens, Richard (2002). Bing Crosby – Crooner of the Century. Celebrity Profiles Publishing Co.. .
Macfarlane, Malcolm. Bing Crosby – Day By Day. Scarecrow Press, 2001.
Osterholm, J. Roger. Bing Crosby: A Bio-Bibliography. Greenwood Press, 1994.

Songs with music by Victor Young
Songs with lyrics by Ned Washington
Bing Crosby songs
Frank Sinatra songs
Ella Fitzgerald songs
1932 songs
Torch songs
Jazz ballads
1930s jazz standards
Billie Holiday songs
Carmen McRae songs
Mildred Bailey songs
Jazz compositions in C major